The Ninja ZX-RR is a race bike from Kawasaki, which raced in the MotoGP world championship until 2009. The bike made its debut towards the end of the 2002 MotoGP season with riders Andrew Pitt (Australia) and Akira Yanagawa (Japan).

Racing history
In 2004, Shinya Nakano joined the Kawasaki team and got the ZX-RR's first podium with a third place at the Japanese Grand Prix. The bike earned second place over the next three years: in 2005 with Olivier Jacque at the  Chinese Grand Prix; in 2006 with Nakano at the Dutch TT; and in 2007 with Randy de Puniet at the Japanese Grand Prix. The ZX-RR struggled in 2008, with the best results being two fifth-place finishes from John Hopkins in Portugal and Anthony West in Brno. Hopkins and West blamed both a lack of feeling in the front end and rear traction on corner exit, a complaint Marco Melandri also had in 2009. During the 2008 season, Kawasaki announced its retirement from the MotoGP world championship. Forward Racing took over the ZX-RR as the Hayate racing team and recruited Marco Melandri to ride during the 2009 season; Melandri won fourth place.  At the end of the season, Hayate withdrew from MotoGP. The bike, with some changes, has been ridden a few times since its last official appearance in 2009 under the name Avintia GP14.

Riders

As the Avintia GP14

Specifications

References

Ninja ZX-RR
Grand Prix motorcycles
Motorcycles introduced in 2002